Tarnobrzeg  is a city in south-eastern Poland (historic Lesser Poland), on the east bank of the river Vistula, with 49,419 inhabitants, as of 31 December 2009. Situated in the Subcarpathian Voivodeship (Polish: Województwo podkarpackie) since 1999, it had previously been the capital of Tarnobrzeg Voivodeship (1975–1998). Tarnobrzeg lies in the Sandomierz Basin, and directly borders the town of Sandomierz, Świętokrzyskie Voivodeship. Its history dates back to the year 1593, when it was granted Magdeburg rights, and belonged to the Tarnowski family. For centuries Tarnobrzeg remained a small town, which did not develop until the post-World War II period, when it became center of an industrial area, based on rich sulfur deposits.

Etymology 
The name Tarnobrzeg refers to the founders of the town, the Tarnowski family. Other names were suggested, such as "Tarnodwor", "Nowo Dwor", and "Nowy Tarnów". Finally, Tarnobrzeg prevailed, and other towns, founded by the Tarnowski family, were also named in a similar fashion, such as Tarnogród and Tarnopol.

Until the 20th century, however, the name Tarnobrzeg was not popular among residents. In common use were such names, as Dzików (see also Dzików Castle) and Miechocin, as these two locations were older, larger and more important. After opening of a rail station called Tarnobrzeg (1887), and creation of the Tarnobrzeg County (1920), the name caught on and became commonly used. Nevertheless, patron saint of the region, is still called Our Lady of Dzików (see also Dominican Church and Convent of Assumption of Mary in Tarnobrzeg).

Location and area 
Tarnobrzeg lies along National Road 9, which is part of the European route E371. The town also is a railroad hub, with five stations located within its limits (Ocice, Sobow, Tarnobrzeg, Tarnobrzeg Waskotorowy and Wielowieś). Rail lines stem from Tarnobrzeg into four directions: southwards towards Dębica, southeast towards Rzeszów, east towards Stalowa Wola, and northwards, towards Sandomierz.

Currently Tarnobrzeg is one of the largest towns of Poland in terms of territory. This is because, in 1975, Tarnobrzeg unexpectedly became the capital of a newly created province, Tarnobrzeg Voivodeship. To expand the town, local authorities initiated a policy of annexation of local villages. As a result, in the late 1970s, the size of the town quickly grew, when several villages and settlements (Machow, Dzików, Miechocin, Wielowieś, Sielec, Podleze, Sobow, Mokrzyszow) became part of Tarnobrzeg as its districts. The Old Town and historic center of Tarnobrzeg covers a very small area of the town, as 80% of Tarnobrzeg was built after the war.

Administrative divisions of Tarnobrzeg 
Boroughs, districts and osiedla of Tarnobrzeg include: Wielowieś, Sielec, Chwałki, Borów,  Wymysłów, Zakrzów, Zwierzyniec, Dzików, Podłęże, Serbinów, Nadole, Old Town, Wielopole, Biała Góra, Podchoiny, Chomki, Siarkowiec, Skalna Góra, Przywiśle, Mokrzyszów, Piastów, Sobów, Chałupki, Miechocin, Ocice, Kozielec, Kajmów, Machów, Nagnajów.

History 

Tarnobrzeg was founded in 1593, during the golden age of Poland, to become the residence of the Tarnowski family (see szlachta). In that year, King Sigismund III Vasa granted Magdeburg rights to the village (May 28, 1593). The founder of the town was Stanislaw Tarnowski, Castellan of Sandomierz. In 1772, it became part of the Austrian Empire and remained in the province of Galicia until November 1918. Tarnobrzeg, located very close to the Russian-Austrian border, sustained heavy damage during World War I by invading armies.

In the aftermath of World War I, the short-lived Republic of Tarnobrzeg was declared here, and in 1919, the town became part of Lwów Voivodeship of the newly independent Second Polish Republic. The city suffered significant emigration within the former Austrian empire and elsewhere during the interbellum years (1919–1939). A public school system was founded during that time.

In the 1950s, after geological research into fuel deposits, significant sulfur resources were discovered.  From the early 1960s the city grew rapidly: the population rose from 5,000 to 50,000 in 1990s. After closing the sulfur mine "Siarkopol" in Machów and Jeziórko a stagnation of Tarnobrzeg followed. In 1999 it ceased being a Voivodeship capital and became a city-county (powiat grodzki).

Timeline of Tarnobrzeg history (note: the history of Tarnobrzeg itself is not very long. Much older are several districts of the contemporary town, such as Wielowieś in its north, and Miechocin in the south).

Till 1772 Poland during the Piast dynasty, Poland during the Jagiellon dynasty, Polish–Lithuanian Commonwealth: Sandomierz Voivodeship
1772 – 1918 Austrian Empire and Austria-Hungary: Kingdom of Galicia and Lodomeria
1918 – 1919 Republic of Tarnobrzeg
1919 – 1939 Second Polish Republic: Lwów Voivodeship
1939 – 1944 Nazi Germany: General Government (Distrikt Krakau, Dębica Land)
1944 – 1975 Polish People's Republic: Rzeszów Voivodeship
1975 – 1998 Polish People's Republic, Third Polish Republic: Tarnobrzeg Voivodeship
From 1999 Poland: Subcarpathian Voivodeship

Tarnowski family 

The history of Tarnobrzeg is closely tied with the noble Leliwita family, which in the 16th century changed its name into Tarnowski. In 1349 Rafal of Tarnów married a woman named Dzierzka, who was the owner of Wielowieś, moving there after the wedding. Their estate gradually expanded, in 1365 they purchased Trzesn and Rzochow, in 1375 Sielec and Sobow, and in 1397, Jan Tarnowski purchased several villages. In the late 15th century, Jan Spytek Tarnowski purchased, among others, Dzików, together with its fortified stronghold. Stanislaw Tarnowski (1541–1609), who was a courtier of Kings Stefan Batory and Sigismund III, managed to convince the latter to grant town charter to Nowy Tarnów, later called Tarnobrzeg. His son Michal Stanislaw (1590–1654) in the 1620s began expansion and modernization of the town, planning a street system together with a market square with a town hall. Furthermore, he expanded the Dzików stronghold and the church at Miechocin.

The development of Nowy Tarnów was stopped during the catastrophic Swedish invasion of Poland (1655–1660), when the town was destroyed by the Swedes. After the invasion, Jan Stanislaw Tarnowski funded a Dominican Monastery, with the painting of Our Lady of Dzików (1678), which was moved there from the Dzików Castle. In 1734, the Dzików Confederation was formed in the Dzików Castle, and among its creators was Jozef Mateusz Tarnowski. In the late 18th century, the castle was remodelled in the late Baroque style, and last owners of Dzików were Jan Zdzislaw Tarnowski (1862–1937), and Artur Tarnowski (1903–1984).

Jewish community 

Pre-Holocaust Tarnobrzeg, a shtetl of western Galicia, was home to a thriving traditional Jewish community. Tarnobrzeg is situated in a region of Poland that is relatively distant from the better-known, larger Jewish communities of the country which were located in cities such as Warsaw, Kraków, Lublin, Lwów, and Wilno. Nonetheless, the History of Jews in Poland is confluent with the history of the town. Jewish inhabitants of Tarnobrzeg, and their descendants, are considered Galitzianers or Galician Jews.

In the years 1772–1918 (see: Partitions of Poland), Tarnobrzeg was in the province of Galicia as part of the Austro-Hungarian Empire, based in Vienna. The 19th century after 1815 was, across Europe, a period of relative peace and stability following the conclusion of the extremely violent Napoleonic Wars.  Due to progressive initiatives following Napoleonic times, Tarnobrzeg citizens including the Jewish community benefited from free compulsory public education mandated by the Austrian Emperor. The same was not true for other Polish Jewry in areas outside of Galicia (e.g., Danzig or Warsaw). Compulsory public education was opposed by some Jewish religious authorities who believed that traditional Jewish Torah and Talmud studies should not even be partially supplanted by secular instruction.

The political stability in Tarnobrzeg and surrounding areas that ended with the collapse of the Austrian Empire as a result of World War I portended a difficult future for Tarnobrzeg's Jews. Although atrocities and population displacements during World War II dominated the history of Tarnobrzeg's Jews, deportations during World War I to trans-Ural Russia were also highly disruptive and destroyed much of the established community. Many emigrated to the United States or Palestine.

Nearby shtetlach (of, e.g., Rozwadów and Ulanów) had many commercial and family ties to Tarnobrzeg. There were several affinity groups among the thriving Jewish population before World War II, including Hasidic, Zionist, Bundist, and others. Many Jewish citizens of Tarnobrzeg emigrated to Palestine, later to become Israel, during the pre-World War II period.

A prominent Tarnobrzeg citizen, Moses Hauser, who was Jewish, was a centenarian whose lifespan nearly coincided with the 19th century. Hauser was a wealthy businessman, trader, and landholder dating from Napoleonic times through the reign of Austrian Emperor Franz Josef. His life is documented in a Yizkor (Memorial) book published by Tarnobrzeg elders following the Holocaust. Hauser was father to twelve children and many descendants who reside in the United States, Israel, and elsewhere.

World War II
Prior to Nazi German and Soviet invasion of Poland in September 1939, there were 3,800 Jewish residents in Tarnobrzeg. The city was overrun by the Germans on 17 September 1939. In order to inflict terror, five prominent Jews were shot at the town square. Following the signing of the German-Soviet Frontier Treaty Jews were being expelled to the Soviet zone of occupation across the San river beginning 2 October 1939, with many others, deported to Mielec and Sandomierz. The atrocities committed by the German occupiers against Jews and other Polish citizens during the Holocaust forced the Jews to choose between mortally dangerous escape or perish by remaining.  Very few Jews are known to have survived in the city, where they would have needed to be hidden for years by righteous gentiles. Those migrating east to Russia had to choose between permanent Soviet citizenship, service in the Red Army in its battles against the Wehrmacht, and loss of freedom to subsequently leave Russia, or alternatively to become displaced persons (DPs). The DPs were temporarily relocated by the Russian government to work camps in Siberia, there to wait out the war. Many of them died due to the extremely rugged conditions, for which they were unprepared, and the poor supplies available in wartime trans-Ural Russian Asia.  Those who survived were permitted to depart Russian lands following World War II.

Economy 
The city was a major center for the mining and processing of sulphur and sulphuric acid. However, due to declining profitability, its mines have closed. The mine in Piaseczno was closed first, followed by the Machów mine (after 40 years of working — it had been the biggest open-cast sulphur mine in Europe), and finally the Jeziórko mine in the 1990s. The Jeziórko mine stayed open as long as it did because of the introduction of the modern Frasch process of sulphur extraction.

Since the 1980s, the land in the mining areas has gradually been reclaimed. The Machów mine has been filled with water to form a reservoir used for recreation, and the same is happening to the Jeziórko mine — it is being slowly filled from the nearby Vistula river.

Tourism

Roman Catholic churches and parishes 
 Church of Mary Magdalene – around 1160, parish since around 1132
 Church of Saint Gertrude and Saint Michael – first church 12th century, parish since 1215, current church 1884
 Monastery of Dominicans – 1667 (wooden), 1706, parish since 1922
 Church of Our Lady of Perpetual Help – wooden church 1979, current church 1984, Parish of Our Lady since 1980
 Church of Good Shepherd – 1990, parish since 1972
 Church of Our Lady of Częstochowa in Tarnobrzeg – 1991, parish since 1969
 Church of Saint Barbara – wooden church 1988, current church 1996, parish since 1989
 Church of Divine Mercy – 1996, parish since 1997
 Church of Visitation – 1997, parish since 1985
 Church of Christ the King – 2003, parish since 2003
 Chapel of All Saints – 2009
 Monastery of Dominicans Sisters in Tarnobrzeg

Sport 

 Siarka Tarnobrzeg – football club

Cyclical events 
 New Year's Run – January
 Tarnobrzeg Days – May, June
 International Organ Virtuoso Performances – July, August
 Saint Dominic's Fair – August
 Bartoszki Film Festival – August
 Satyrblues  – September
 International Alfred Freyer Vistula River Run – October
 Tarnobrzeg Social Days and Tarnobrzeg Days of The Christian Culture – October
 Barbórkowa Drama Teatralna – December

Twin towns – sister cities 
Tarnobrzeg is twinned with:

 Banská Bystrica in Slovakia (since 1995) 
 Chernihiv in Ukraine (since 2008)

See also 
Tarnowski family
Siarka Tarnobrzeg – local football team
Dzików Castle
Lesser Polish Way

References 
Notes

External links 
Tarnobrzeg city council
Tarnobrzeg Forum – City life
Tarnobrzeg's Jewish Community
Historical Museum of the City of Tarnobrzeg (polish)

 
Populated places established in 1593
Cities and towns in Podkarpackie Voivodeship
Sandomierz Voivodeship
Kingdom of Galicia and Lodomeria
Lwów Voivodeship
City counties of Poland
Holocaust locations in Poland
Socialist planned cities